Alexander Madrid (born April 18, 1963) is a former right-handed Major League Baseball pitcher who played from 1987 to 1989 for the Milwaukee Brewers and Philadelphia Phillies.

Before professional baseball
Prior to playing professional baseball, he attended Yavapai College.

The draft
Madrid was drafted four different times. He was first drafted in the second round of the 1982 January phase draft by the Chicago Cubs. He was then drafted by the Cincinnati Reds in the second round of the 1982 June Secondary draft. In the January Secondary phase draft, he was taken by the Texas Rangers in the first round. He finally signed after being drafted by the Brewers in the second round of the 1983 June Secondary draft.

The minor leagues
Madrid began his professional career with the Beloit Brewers in 1984, going 6–7 with a 4.19 ERA in 22 games started. He played for the Stockton Ports in 1985, and in 1986 he went 12–9 with a 6.03 ERA for the El Paso Diablos. With the Denver Zephyrs in 1987, Madrid went 5–7 with a 5.35 ERA.

First trip to the Major Leagues
Despite doing poorly in the minor leagues in 1987, Madrid still earned a call up to the Major Leagues, and on July 20, 1987, he made his big league debut. In his first game, while facing the Seattle Mariners, he pitched 1 innings, allowing four hits and three earned runs. Still, the Brewers won the game 13–11. He would pitch two more games in 1987, going 0–0 with a 15.19 ERA in 5 innings overall. He allowed 11 hits, nine earned runs and one walk.

1988
Madrid began the 1988 season with Denver, going 5–2 with a 4.06 ERA for them. On August 24, he was traded to the Phillies for Mike Young, and then pitched two games for the Maine Phillies, going 0–0 with a 2.32 ERA. Overall, he went 5–2 with a 3.86 ERA in the minor leagues in 1988.

He pitched a few games for the big league Phillies that season, going 1–1 with a 2.76 ERA. He even threw a complete game, although it was a rain-shortened affair.

1989
He pitched in both the big leagues and minor leagues in 1989. In the minors, he went 3–6 with a 4.84 ERA for the Scranton/Wilkes-Barre Red Barons. He went 1–2 with a 5.47 ERA in the majors that year. On May 30, he appeared in his final major league game.

1990
Although he would not appear in the majors after 1989, Madrid did pitch in the minors until 1990, splitting time between the Clearwater Phillies and Red Barons. For the Clearwater Phillies, he went 1–1 with an 0.95 ERA. With the Red Barons, he went 3–8 with a 4.65 ERA. In total, he went 4–9 with a 4.02 ERA that season.

Major league totals
In the major leagues, Madrid went 2–3 with a 5.63 ERA in 14 games (five started). In 46 innings, he allowed 58 hits, 30 runs, 29 earned runs and four home runs. He walked 21 batters, struck out 16 and threw five wild pitches.

External links

Living people
1963 births
Major League Baseball pitchers
Milwaukee Brewers players
Philadelphia Phillies players
Baseball players from Arizona
Yavapai Roughriders baseball players
People from Springerville, Arizona
Alaska Goldpanners of Fairbanks players
Beloit Brewers players
Clearwater Phillies players
Denver Zephyrs players
El Paso Diablos players
Maine Phillies players
Scranton/Wilkes-Barre Red Barons players
Stockton Ports players
American expatriate baseball players in Mexico
Sultanes de Monterrey players